Barnstormer is a thrill ride at Dollywood in Pigeon Forge, TN.
It is located in Owen's Farm section of the park. It opened on March 28, 2011. It cost $5.5 million and is Dollywood's first S&S Worldwide amusement ride.

The ride was made famous in June 2012 by a viral YouTube video of a father and daughter riding a similar ride twice. The video was featured on national media outlets including the Huffington Post.

Specifications 
Barnstormer is a Screamin' Swing type ride built by S&S Worldwide, and installed by Ride Entertainment Group. The ride lasts about one minute, and can accommodate 450 passengers per hour. Riders must be  or taller. Riders are restrained by a lap bar.

References

Pendulum rides
Amusement rides manufactured by S&S – Sansei Technologies
Dollywood
Amusement rides introduced in 2011